Hesperia sassacus, the Indian skipper, is a butterfly of the family Hesperiidae.

Taxonomy
The following subspecies are recognised:
Hesperia sassacus sassacus Harris, 1862
Hesperia sassacus manitoboides (Fletcher, 1889)
Hesperia sassacus nantahala Gatrelle & Grkovich, 2003

Description
The wingspan is 25–30 mm. The flight period is late May to early July.

Distribution and habitat
It is found from northeastern U.S., and in Canada in southwestern New Brunswick and in a broad band from the Eastern Townships of Quebec through to southern Manitoba.

Ecology and behaviour
The larvae feed on nodding fescue (Festuca obtusa), poverty grass (Danthonia spicata), and panic grass (Panicum), Bouteloua, Andropogon, Aristida, and Poaceae species.

References

External links
Indian Skipper, Butterflies and Moths of North America

Hesperia (butterfly)
Butterflies described in 1862